The Bailey Allinder House is a historic house located at 301 Skyline Drive in the Park Hill neighborhood of North Little Rock, Arkansas. It is representative of the transition from the Minimal Traditional style to the Ranch style form, yet it also reflects subtle Rustic influences reminiscent of Frank Lloyd Wright's incorporation of natural materials and setting in the design of his work.

Description and history 
It is a single-story L-shaped structure, fashioned out of sandstone and fieldstone. The house, built in 1948–49, represents a stylistic transition between the pre-World War II minimalist architecture of the early houses in the neighborhood, and more typical Ranch style construction found in later houses. Bailey Allinder was an auto mechanic; his wife was a piano teacher.

The house was listed on the National Register of Historic Places on December 27, 2002.

See also
National Register of Historic Places listings in Pulaski County, Arkansas

References

Houses on the National Register of Historic Places in Arkansas
Houses completed in 1949
Houses in North Little Rock, Arkansas
National Register of Historic Places in Pulaski County, Arkansas